The Italian Liberation Corps ( (CIL)) was an corps of the Italian Co-belligerent Army during the Italian campaign of World War II. After the announcement of the Armistice of Cassibile on 8 September 1943 the Italian government began the formation of units to fight on the allied side against Germany. On 18 April 1944 the Italian Liberation Corps was formed, which after an intense cycle of combat operations was disbanded on 24 September 1944 to form division-sized combat groups.

History

Constitution 
On 13 October 1943 Italy declared war on Germany and the Italian government began with the formation of military units to fight on the allied side. The first large unit to be raised was the brigade-sized I Motorized Grouping activated on 27 November 1943 in San Pietro Vernotico near Brindisi with units and personnel of the 58th Infantry Division "Legnano" and 18th Infantry Division "Messina".

On 18 April 1944 the I Motorized Grouping was expanded to division-size and renamed Italian Liberation Corps. With the arrival of the 184th Paratroopers Division "Nembo" from Sardinia on 26 May 1944 did the Italian Liberation Corps reach corps-size. In 27 May 1944 the corps was assigned to the Polish II Corps and in July 1944 it participated in the Battle of Ancona.

On 24 September 1944 the corps was disbanded its units and personnel used to form the combat groups "Folgore" and "Legnano".

Organization 
The Italian Liberation Corps organization from 26 May until 24 September 1944 was:

Italian Liberation Corps 
 Italian Liberation Corps, Generale di Divisione Umberto Utili
 11th Motorized Artillery Regiment (from the 104th Infantry Division "Mantova")
 I Artillery Group (105/28 howitzers)
 II Artillery Group (100/22 howitzers)
 III Artillery Group (75/18 Mod. 34 howitzers)
 IV Artillery Group (75/18 Mod. 34 howitzers)
 V Anti-tank Group ((47/32 anti-tank guns)
 Anti-aircraft Battery (20/65 Mod. 35 anti-aircraft guns)
 CLXVI Army Corps Artillery Group (149/19 Mod. 37 howitzers)
 LI Mixed Engineer Battalion (formed 13 November 1943)
 51st Engineers Company
 51st Telegraph and Radio Operators Company
 Corps Services

184th Paratroopers Division "Nembo" 
 184th Paratroopers Division "Nembo", Generale di Brigata Giorgio Morigi
 Command Company
 183rd Paratroopers Regiment "Nembo"
 Command Company
 XV Paratroopers Battalion
 XVI Paratroopers Battalion
 Paratroopers Support Weapons Company (47/32 anti-tank guns)
 184th Paratroopers Regiment "Nembo"
 Command Company
 XIII Paratroopers Battalion
 XIV Paratroopers Battalion
 Paratroopers Support Weapons Company (47/32 anti-tank guns)
 184th Artillery Regiment "Nembo"
 Command Battery
 I Paratroopers Artillery Group (75/27 field guns)
 II Paratroopers Artillery Group (100/22 howitzers)
 III Paratroopers Anti-tank Group (QF 6-pounder anti-tank guns)
 184th Paratroopers Anti-aircraft Battery (20/65 Mod. 35 anti-aircraft guns)
 CLXXXIV Paratrooper Sappers Battalion
 184th Paratrooper Motorcyclists Company
 184th Mortar Company (81mm Mod. 35 mortars)
 184th Paratrooper Telegraph and Radio Operators Company
 184th Paratrooper Engineers Company
 184th Transport Unit
 184th Medical Section
 184th Supply Section
 324th Carabinieri Section
 146th Field Post Office

I Brigade 
 I Brigade, Colonel Ettore Fucci
 3rd Alpini Regiment (formed on 25 June 1944)
 Alpini Battalion "Piemonte"
 Alpini Battalion "Monte Granero" (joined 25 June 1944)
 4th Bersaglieri Regiment (formed 1 February 1944)
 XXI Bersaglieri Battalion
 XXXIII Bersaglieri Battalion
 1st Bersaglieri Motorcyclists Company
 CLXXXV Paratroopers Battalion "Nembo" (joined the I Motorized Grouping in January 1944)
 IV Alpine Artillery Group (75/13 Mod. 15 howitzers)
 Brigade Services

II Brigade 
 II Brigade, Colonel Teodoro Moggio
 68th Infantry Regiment "Legnano"
 I Fusiliers Battalion
 II Fusiliers Battalion
 Navy Regiment "San Marco" (Royal Italian Navy, joined in early June 1944)
 Battalion "Bafile" (joined April 1944)
 Battalion "Grado" (joined early June 1944)
 IX Assault Unit (joined the I Motorized Grouping on 20 March 1944)
 Squadron "Cavalleggeri Guide" (joined the IX Assault Unit on 27 June 1944)
 V Alpine Artillery Group (75/13 Mod. 15 howitzers)
 Brigade Services

Commanding officers 
The division's commanding officer was:

 Generale di Brigata Umberto Utili (18 April 1944 - 24 September 1944)

See also 
 Italian Co-belligerent Army

References 

Army corps of Italy in World War II
it:Corpo Italiano di Liberazione